Ernest Biéler (July 31, 1863 – June 25, 1948) was a multi-talented Swiss painter, draughtsman and printmaker. He worked in oil, tempera, watercolour, gouache, ink, charcoal, pastels, acrylic and pencil. He also created mosaics and stained glass windows.

Biography 
He was born in Rolle, Switzerland. After completing his education in Lausanne, he studied at the Académie Julian in Paris. In 1900, he received the silver medal of the Exposition Universelle of Paris. He was made a Knight of the Légion d'honneur.

Although he travelled widely, he remained attached to Savièse and often depicted scenes of peasant life with a remarkable degree of detail. Bieler also produced stained glass windows for the church and the federal building in Bern, and decorated a ceiling for the City Theatre in Berne. He also painted the interior of the Victoria Hall, but this work was destroyed during the 1984 fire of the building.

He died in 1948 in Lausanne.

Sources

Ernest Bieler (Swiss, 1863-1948). Biography & picture
Ernest Bieler (Swiss, 1863-1948). Watercolor portraits

References

External links
 
Gallery of Paintings

1863 births
1948 deaths
Chevaliers of the Légion d'honneur
19th-century Swiss painters
19th-century Swiss male artists
Swiss male painters
20th-century Swiss painters
20th-century Swiss male artists
People from Rolle
Swiss stained glass artists and manufacturers
Académie Julian alumni